Georgian Dream – Democratic Georgia is a political party in Georgia. The party was established on 19 April 2012 by the billionaire businessman Bidzina Ivanishvili. Georgian Dream and its partners in a coalition also named Georgian Dream won majorities in the 2012, 2016, and 2020 general elections. The party is currently led by Irakli Kobakhidze as Party Chairman and Irakli Garibashvili as Prime Minister.

History
The party evolved from the public movement Georgian Dream, launched by Ivanishvili as a platform for his political activities in December 2011. Since Ivanishvili was not a Georgian citizen at the moment of the party's inaugural session, the lawyer Manana Kobakhidze was elected as an interim, nominal chairman of the Georgian Dream – Democratic Georgia. The party also includes several notable Georgians such as the politician Sozar Subari, former diplomat Tedo Japaridze, chess grandmaster Zurab Azmaiparashvili, security commentator Irakli Sesiashvili, writer Guram Odisharia and famed footballer Kakha Kaladze.

The party successfully challenged the ruling United National Movement (UNM) in the 2012 parliamentary election, pledging to increase welfare spending and pursue a more pragmatic foreign policy with Russia. It won this election in coalition with six other opposition parties, with 54.97% of the vote, being allotted 85 seats in parliament. The governing UNM took 40.34%. President Mikheil Saakashvili conceded that his party lost, and pledged to support the constitutional process of forming a new government.

On 25 October 2012, Bidzina Ivanishvili was elected as the prime minister of Georgia. During this period, the State Universal Healthcare Program came into force (making emergency surgeries and childbirth free of charge), the reform of the system of self-governance was initiated and the project on saving agriculture was developed. In November 2013, Ivanishvili voluntarily stepped down as prime minister after just 13 months in office, saying that he was quitting the political arena.

In October 2013, Giorgi Margvelashvili, a member of the Georgian Dream party, won the presidential election, gaining 61.12% of the vote. He succeeded President Mikheil Saakashvili, who had served the maximum two terms since coming to power in the bloodless 2003 "Rose Revolution".

In April 2018 senior MP Gedevan Popkhadze threatened to quit the party for its endorsement of an opposition-nominated candidate, journalist Ninia Kakabadze to the supervisory board of the Georgian Public Broadcaster. Popkhadze criticized Kakabadze for being anti-religious. The incident is seen as an internal conflict between long-time GD members which joined the party while it was in opposition and a new group of members who were installed in high positions prior to the 2016 parliamentary elections. The news agency Democracy and Freedom Watch related the incident to the return of Bidzina Ivanishvili as chairman of the party later that month, which furthermore was perceived as a move to maintain the unity of the coalition.

In August 2018, Irakli Kobakhidze announced that the party would not nominate a candidate for the 2018 presidential elections. Instead it would support the independent candidate Salome Zourabichvili.

During the 2019 Georgian protests, the party was accused of being corrupt, covertly pro-Russian and subservient to Russian interests by a group of Georgian opposition parties who led the demonstrations. In late 2019 Facebook publicly announced that it removed from Facebook and Instagram a number of accounts and pages engaged in coordinated inauthentic behavior that sought to promote the Georgian Dream government. Analysts said that although Georgian Dream suffered a dip in popularity in the aftermath of the 2019 protests, its relatively successful handling of the COVID-19 pandemic led to a boost in popularity, which helped it to secure victory in the 2020 parliamentary election. However, accusations of electoral fraud by the Georgian opposition subsequently led to the six-month political crisis in Georgia. 

On 11 January 2021, shortly after the election, Ivanishvili announced that he was decisively leaving politics and resigned as Chairman of Georgian Dream, stating that "he had accomplished his goal". Irakli Kobakhidze was elected as a new chairman of the party.

In February 2021, the Georgian Dream underwent split following the Giorgi Gakharia's unexpected resignation from the post of Prime Minister of Georgia. Gakharia cited disagreement with his party colleagues over enforcing an arrest order for Nika Melia, who was sent to pre-trial detention by the Court after he declined to pay bail. Melia, chairman of the opposition United National Movement party, was accused of organizing mass violence during the anti-government protests in 2019. Although Gakharia agreed that Melia's prosecution was lawful, he wanted to postpone Melia's arrest to avoid further political tensions between the government and the opposition. Gakharia also said that he no longer agreed with the positions of the Georgian Dream and he therefore was leaving the party. Several MPs from Georgian Dream joined him to form a new party For Georgia. The Georgian Dream party supported Irakli Garibashvili to replace Gakharia, and the Parliament voted 89–2 to appoint him as the next prime minister. Garibashvili had an earlier term as prime minister in 2013–2015, and was considered to be a close ally of Bidzina Ivanishvili, which led to speculations whether Ivanishvili continued to influence politics behind the scenes.

Even though the government and the opposition worked to bring an end to the political crisis in April 2021, the tensions remained high. In tense 2021 Georgian local elections, the Georgian Dream managed to secure victory, gaining 46.75% of the vote. The mayoral candidates of the Georgian Dream won in all municipalities except Tsalenjikha. However, the party lost majority in seven out of 64 municipal assemblies.

In 2022, nine MPs left Georgian Dream to establish People's Power, which led to Georgian Dream losing parliamentary majority. At the same time, the deputies decided to remain in the ruling majority, supporting the government.

Ideology
Like many parties of power, Georgian Dream lacks a clear ideology. The reasons that were given for this range from the party's history as an all-encompassing front of people opposed to the UNM government to the standard opportunism associated with such parties. Levan Lortkipanidze, a political science student at Tbilisi State University, described it as "a party of nomenclature, public servants, 'intelligentsia', medium and large businessmen, and technocrats – a party, which is held together through loyalty to its charismatic leader and the opposition to the government of the 'Rose Revolution.'"

The party self-identifies as social democratic and names the creation of a welfare state as an objective. According to the Georgian Institute of Politics, Georgian Dream's economic policy comprises a combination of the pre-existing free market model, created by their predecessors, with a comprehensive centre-left safety net. The introduction of universal healthcare and insurance systems are often cited as the most successful policies implemented by the Georgian Dream. Nevertheless, it has been reported that a number of left-wing activists view the party as "ideologically amorphous". The Georgian Dream is registered as an observer with the Party of European Socialists.

The party's positions on social and cultural issues have been described as ambiguous and inconsistent. It has been reported that the party has both culturally liberal and conservative factions. The party has at times been described as liberal by leading party politicians such as Irakli Kobakhidze. During its first government, the party passed legislation against discrimination toward LGBT individuals, making Georgia the most LGBT-friendly country in the South Caucasus de jure. In 2017, the party's majority amended the constitution to define marriage as "a union between a woman and a man for the purpose of creating a family." According to the 2021 study by the Georgian Institute of Politics, on a number of issues, such as the legalization of soft drugs, selling agricultural land to foreigners, abolishing mandatory military service, providing sex education in high schools and funding the Georgian Orthodox Church from the state budget, the Georgian Dream holds moderately conservative views, while it holds liberal positions on issues such as allowing ethnic minorities to receive state services in their own language, mandating gender quotas in parliament to increase women's representation in politics and etc.

The party supports green politics, advocating banning old cars for their high levels of carbon emissions and introducing a corporate green tax for businesses that cause environmental pollution.

In the field of foreign policy and security, the Georgian Dream supports the European integration, while also taking pragmatic approach to Russia. In December 2020, the Parliament of Georgia, attended only by the representatives of the "Georgian Dream", adopted a resolution declaring integration into the EU and NATO as Georgia's priorities "without alternative". The resolution also talks about strengthening the partnership with the UK, France, the Baltic countries and the Visegrad Group. The document points at the "pragmatic and principled" policy towards Russia. Under the Georgian Dream leadership, Georgia has signed an Association Agreement and a Free Trade Agreement with the European Union.

The biggest rival party is the United National Movement of Mikheil Saakashvili. Therefore, the party's ideology is focused on opposing the UNM and Saakashvili. In this context, political debates often focus on relations with Russia, with both parties accusing each other of 'playing into Moscow's hands'. Social issues are mostly absent from political speeches and debates.

Georgian Dream coalition
Georgian Dream – Democratic Georgia was the leading member of the Georgian Dream Coalition, which initially included six political parties of diverse ideological orientations. The coalition was made up of parties ranging from pro-market and pro-western liberals to nationalists and protectionists, united in their dislike of Saakashvili and the United National Movement. The name of the alliance is inspired by a rap song by Ivanishvili's son Bera.

Former constituent parties

 Georgian Dream – Democratic Georgia
Green Party of Georgia (left the coalition before the 2020 parliamentary election)
Our Georgia – Free Democrats (left the coalition and became an opposition party on 5 November 2014)
National Forum (left the coalition after party convention where majority of party members voted to leave on 3 April 2016)
Republican Party of Georgia (left the coalition in March 2016)
Industry Will Save Georgia (left the coalition before the 2016 election)
Social Democrats for the Development of Georgia (members left in February and March 2019 due to problems concerning the Judiciary and Pension system)
Conservative Party of Georgia (left over the 2019 Georgian protests)

Electoral performance

Parliamentary

Presidential

Local

Presidents of Georgia from Georgian Dream

Prime Ministers of Georgia from Georgian Dream

Leadership

The party is led by the Chair, who is the leader of the party's political council. Current chairman is Irakli Kobakhidze.

Party chairs
 Bidzina Ivanishvili (2012–2013)
 Irakli Garibashvili (2013–2015)
 Giorgi Kvirikashvili (2015–2018)
 Bidzina Ivanishvili (2018–2021)
 Irakli Kobakhidze (2021–present)

Notelist

References

External links
Georgian Dream – Democratic Georgia official website

2012 establishments in Georgia (country)
Parties related to the Party of European Socialists
Political parties established in 2012
Political parties in Georgia (country)
Pro-European political parties in Georgia (country)
Progressive Alliance
Centre-left parties in Georgia (country)
Social democratic parties in Georgia (country)